Dinah Sings Bessie Smith is the ninth studio album by blues, R&B and jazz singer Dinah Washington released on the Emarcy label, and reissued by Verve Records in 1999 as The Bessie Smith Songbook. The album arrangements are headed by Robare Edmondson and Ernie Wilkins, and the songs are associated with American blues singer  Bessie Smith. Allmusic details the album in its review as saying: "It was only natural that the "Queen of the Blues" should record songs associated with the "Empress of the Blues." The performances by the septet/octet do not sound like the 1920s and the purposely ricky-tick drumming is insulting, but Dinah Washington sounds quite at home on this music".

Track listing

Additional tracks on 1999 CD reissue 

"Trombone Butter" is a remake of "Trombone Cholly" with Quentin "Butter" Jackson playing Charlie Green's trombone part.

Personnel
Dinah Washington – Lead Vocals
Eddie Chamblee - Sax (Tenor)
Eddie Chamblee & Orchestra
Charles Davis - Sax (Baritone)
McKinley Easton - Sax (Baritone)
Harold Ousley - Sax (Baritone)
Sahib Shihab - Sax (Baritone)
Jack Wilson - Piano
James Craig - Piano
Wynton Kelly - Piano
Quentin Jackson - Trombone
Julian Priester - Trombone
Melba Liston - Trombone
Fortunatus "Fip" Ricard - Trumpet
Blue Mitchell - Trumpet
Clark Terry - Trumpet
Robert Lee Wilson - Bass
Robert Edmondson - Bass
Paul West - Bass
James Slaughter - Drums
Max Roach - Drums
The Newport All Stars
Robare Edmondson - Arranger
Ernie Wilkins - Arranger
Bob Shad – producer
Dennis Drake - Digital Remastering

References

Dinah Washington albums
1958 albums
EmArcy Records albums
Albums produced by Bob Shad
Albums arranged by Ernie Wilkins
Albums conducted by Ernie Wilkins